is a 2019 Japanese comedy drama film based on a Japanese television drama miniseries Final Fantasy XIV: Dad of Light, which is based on blog post Dad of Light written by Maidy. The film stars Kentaro Sakaguchi, Kōtarō Yoshida, Maika Yamamoto and Naomi Zaizen.

Cast
 Kentaro Sakaguchi as Akio Iwamoto
 Kōtarō Yoshida as Akira Iwamoto
 Maika Yamamoto as Miki Iwamoto
 Naomi Zaizen as Yukiko Iwamoto
 Yui Sakuma as Satomi Ide
 Kou Maehara as Kensuke
 Yui Imaizumi as Kataoka
 Nonomura Hanano as Ogasawara
 Jundai Yamada as Kenichiro Mihara
 Masato Wada as Hidetaka Nakajima
 Ryuta Sato as Shintaro Yoshii
 Yoshino Nanjō as Maidy (voice)
 Minako Kotobuki as Aru-chan (voice)
 Aoi Yūki as Kirin (voice)

Production
Original story author Maidy stated that they were happy to help create a movie version of their story as there were still issues to explore not covered by the television series. Differences from the television version of the story, Final Fantasy XIV: Dad of Light, include the addition of a fourth sibling to the family. Another change was to have other characters play Final Fantasy XIV not just father and son. Square Enix also gave the filmmakers their own game server to control the time of day and weather in order to film exactly the kinds of shots they wished.

With the production crew filming on a private server, crew members created characters and appeared in the background to make the world feel like the regular game. Since the television series was released, many features were added to make characters more expressive including group poses and facial expressions. Game footage was recorded at 120 frames per second to allow for the seamless use of slow motion effects. Changes were also made to a key story moment where the son is turned around by his father in game, changing the televisions wholly in-game perspective to one showing the father and son playing the game and deciding what to do.

Release and Reception
It was released in Japan by Gaga on June 21, 2019. It was released on Netflix Japan on July 21, 2020.

Famitsu recommended the film, saying that viewers familiar with the television version of the story or fans of massively multiplayer online role-playing games will particularly love the story. The film ranked first in Japanese survey app Pia for audience satisfaction for the weekend it released.

The South China Morning Post gave the film 3.5 out of 5 stars, saying the project was like a “glorified commercial” as well as a touching melodrama. A special screening was done of the movie in Japan after Maidy, the stories original author, died from cancer.

References

External links
 

2019 films
2019 comedy-drama films
2010s Japanese-language films
Japanese comedy-drama films
Films about father–son relationships
Final Fantasy XIV
Final Fantasy films
Films about families
Films about video games
Films with live action and animation
Comedy-drama films based on actual events
Films based on role-playing video games
Films based on television series
Films based on diaries
Works based on blogs
Films based on multiple works
Live-action films based on video games
2010s Japanese films